The Workplace Hazardous Materials Information System (WHMIS; , SIMDUT) is Canada's national workplace hazard communication standard. The key elements of the system, which came into effect on October 31, 1988, are cautionary labelling of containers of WHMIS controlled products, the provision of material safety data sheets (MSDSs) and worker education and site-specific training programs.

WHMIS is an example of synchronization and cooperation amongst Canada's federal, provincial and territorial governments. The coordinated approach avoided duplication, inefficiency through loss of scale and the interprovincial trade barriers that would have been created had each province and territory established its own hazard communication system.

Legislative framework
The federal Hazardous Products Act and associated Controlled Products Regulations, administered by the National Office of WHMIS residing in the federal Department of Health Canada, established the national standard for chemical classification and hazard communication in Canada and is the foundation for the workers' "right-to-know" legislation enacted in each of Canada's provinces and territories.

Under the Constitution of Canada, labour legislation falls primarily under the jurisdiction of Canada's provinces and territories. The Labour Program, of the federal government Department of Human Resources and Skills Development Canada, is the occupational health and safety (OHS) regulatory authority for the approximately 10% of workplaces designated to be under federal jurisdiction. As such, each of the thirteen federal, provincial and territorial (FPT) agencies responsible for OHS has established employer WHMIS requirements within their respective jurisdiction. These requirements place an onus on employers to ensure that controlled products used, stored or handled in the workplace are properly labelled, that material safety data sheets are made available to workers, and that workers receive education and site-specific training to ensure the safe storage, handling and use of controlled products in the workplace.

Public engagement
Industry, organized labour and all governments actively participated in the development of WHMIS; i.e., Canada's national workplace hazard communication system represents a consensus amongst stakeholders. The system, a shared responsibility, continues to evolve through consensus. This system of identifying Hazardous Materials is taught to students and employees working in Canada.

WHMIS 2015
On February 11, 2015, the Government of Canada published in the Canada Gazette a new modified version of the WHMIS system called WHMIS 2015. WHMIS 2015 was created "to incorporate the Globally Harmonized System of Classification and Labelling of Chemicals (GHS) for workplace chemicals."

See also
 Hazard symbol
 Hazard Communication Standard

References

External links

 
 Seeking Information from the Workplace Hazardous Materials Bureau in Health Canada and from the Federal, Provincial and Territorial (FPT) Occupational Health and Safety Regulatory Agencies
 Subscribe to "WHMIS News" from Health Canada
 Canada's WHMIS website for the GHS 
 Canadian WHMIS MSDS FAQ (Nexreg Compliance)
 WHMIS Classifications Database (CCOHS)
 Provincial Safety Councils of Canada: Courses on WHMIS and other safety information
 A major exemption from WHMIS
 CSST information on WHMIS and the GHS in Canada 

Safety in North America
Health in Canada
Standards of Canada
Occupational safety and health